"The Sad Bag of Shaky Jake" is a single released in 1969 by English rock band Humble Pie. The B-side "Cold Lady" was written by drummer Jerry Shirley in a R&B style and Shirley plays Wurlitzer piano and guitarist Peter Frampton plays the drums.

Although released in a number of European countries, including West Germany and the Netherlands, it was not made available in the United Kingdom or other worldwide territories. The first live performance of this song by the band, was during their appearance at the beginning of the Bilzen Festival in Belgium, on 29 August 1969. The same follows their recording-and-broadcast for the BBC, on 7 August 1969, at the Lime Grove Studios, Shepherd's Bush, west London,

Personnel

"The Sad Bag of Shaky Jake"
Steve Marriott — vocals, Wurlitzer electric piano, harmonica, guitar, maracas
Peter Frampton — vocals, lead guitar 
Greg Ridley — vocals, bass guitar
Jerry Shirley — drums, tambourine

"Cold Lady"
Steve Marriott – lead vocals, guitar
Peter Frampton – backing vocals, drums
Greg Ridley – backing vocals, bass guitar
Jerry Shirley – Wurlitzer electric piano, maracas

References

External links
 Official Humble Pie website

1969 singles
Humble Pie (band) songs
Songs written by Steve Marriott
Song recordings produced by Glyn Johns
1969 songs
Immediate Records singles